Puketona is a locality at the junction of State Highway 10 and State Highway 11 in the Far North District of New Zealand. Kerikeri is 10 kilometres north, Paihia is 14 kilometres east, Moerewa is 15 kilometres southeast, and Kaikohe is 20 kilometres southwest.

The name means vagina or vulva in the Māori language.

Geography
There are six or seven small scoria cones around Puketona, one of which was host to Puketona Pā in the 18th century. Charles Darwin made observations of these cones in December 1835. The cones have been quarried since the 1950s.

Demographics

Puketona-Waitangi had a population of 1,335 at the 2018 New Zealand census, an increase of 195 people (17.1%) since the 2013 census, and an increase of 228 people (20.6%) since the 2006 census. There were 522 households, comprising 705 males and 633 females, giving a sex ratio of 1.11 males per female. The median age was 48.6 years (compared with 37.4 years nationally), with 231 people (17.3%) aged under 15 years, 180 (13.5%) aged 15 to 29, 627 (47.0%) aged 30 to 64, and 300 (22.5%) aged 65 or older.

Ethnicities were 85.6% European/Pākehā, 24.9% Māori, 0.9% Pacific peoples, 2.5% Asian, and 1.6% other ethnicities. People may identify with more than one ethnicity.

The percentage of people born overseas was 21.1, compared with 27.1% nationally.

Although some people chose not to answer the census's question about religious affiliation, 58.7% had no religion, 29.0% were Christian, 2.0% had Māori religious beliefs, 0.4% were Hindu, 0.2% were Muslim, 0.7% were Buddhist and 1.8% had other religions.

Of those at least 15 years old, 192 (17.4%) people had a bachelor's or higher degree, and 171 (15.5%) people had no formal qualifications. The median income was $30,900, compared with $31,800 nationally. 168 people (15.2%) earned over $70,000 compared to 17.2% nationally. The employment status of those at least 15 was that 528 (47.8%) people were employed full-time, 183 (16.6%) were part-time, and 33 (3.0%) were unemployed.

History
Puketona was a Pā and the site of the battle of Taumataiwi or Wai-whariki between Ngāti Maru and Ngāti Rangi of Ngāpuhi in about 1793.

He had the property taken care of by shepherds from 1840. One of these was murdered, and the case was reported as the first case of murder dealt with under British justice in New Zealand. In 1851 he transferred the property to his son Edward Marsh Williams, who built a house there in 1860 or 1861, and lived there until 1881. The house, now known as Choat House, is listed as a Category 1 Historic Place.
 
The road between Paihia and Pakaraka, passing through Puketona, was sealed from 1939, although the quality of the new road appears to have been lacking. Electricity was first supplied to the area in the mid 1940s.

References

Far North District
Populated places in the Northland Region